Escape from Hell may refer to:
Escape from Hell (novel), a 2009 novel by Larry Niven and Jerry Pournelle
Escape from Hell!, a novella by Hal Duncan
Escape from Hell (1928 film), a 1928 German silent drama film
Escape from Hell (1980 film), a women-in-prison film
Escape from Hell (2000 film), a Christian film
Escape from hell (1990 game), 1990 game by Electronnic Arts